The Drum (released in the U.S. as Drums) is a 1938 British  Technicolor film based on the 1937 novel The Drum by A. E. W. Mason. The film was directed by Zoltan Korda and produced by Alexander Korda. It stars Sabu, Raymond Massey, Valerie Hobson, Roger Livesey and David Tree.

Korda’s company London Films made three films in the 1930s about the British Empire: Sanders of the River (1936), The Drum and The Four Feathers (1939).

Plot
During the British Raj, Captain Carruthers (Roger Livesey) works under cover to track smuggled shipments of arms on the restless Northwest Frontier of India, the modern day Afghanistan-Pakistan border (the Durand Line). He fears a full-scale rebellion is brewing. To forestall this, the British governor (Francis L. Sullivan) signs a treaty with the friendly, peace-loving ruler of Tokot, a key kingdom in the region, which is described as four days' march northward from Peshawar. In real life the British held a fort at Abazai near this location, not far from the famous Takht Bhai ruins. Meanwhile, the king's son, Prince Azim (Sabu), befriends Carruthers and a British drummer boy, Bill Holder (Desmond Tester), who teaches him how to play the instrument.

However, the king's brother, Prince Ghul (Raymond Massey), has the king assassinated and usurps the throne; Azim escapes a similar fate thanks to two loyal retainers. They hide out in Peshawar, where the British are based. When one of Ghul's men finds and tries to kill the prince, Azim is rescued by Carruthers' wife (Valerie Hobson). Although he is offered sanctuary, Azim declines, believing it to be safer to remain hidden among his own people.

Carruthers is then sent to negotiate with Ghul, who pretends to want to honour the treaty. In reality, Ghul is the mastermind behind the rebellion. He plots to kill Carruthers and his detachment of men on the last day of a festival to signal the start of the revolt. Prince Azim learns of the ambush. When he is unable to convince the governor, he chooses to risk his own life to warn his friends. After Azim leaves for home, the governor receives confirmation of the plot and sends four battalions to the rescue.

Azim manages to warn Carruthers of the impending massacre by playing a danger signal on the "Sacred Drum of Tokot", saving many British lives. Ghul is killed in the ensuing battle and Azim is installed as his replacement.

Cast

 Sabu as Prince Azim
 Raymond Massey as Prince Ghul
 Roger Livesey as Capt. Carruthers
 Valerie Hobson as Mrs. Carruthers
 David Tree as Lieut. Escott
 Desmond Tester as Bill Holder
 Francis L. Sullivan as Governor
 Archibald Batty as Major Bond
 Frederick Culley as Dr. Murphy
 Amid Taftazani as Mohammed Khan
 Lawrence Baskcomb as Zarullah
 Roy Emerton as Wafadar
 Michael Martin Harvey as Mullah
 Martin Walker as Herrick
 Ronald Adam as Major Gregoff
 Charles Oliver as Rajab
 Julian Mitchell as Sergeant
 Miriam Pieris as Indian dancer

Production
The Scottish regiment featured in this film is a battalion of the Gordon Highlanders, as evident from the cap badge, kilt and headdress. This is true to life, as the Gordon Highlanders were very active on the North-West Frontier during the British Raj, and were, for a time, garrisoned at Fort Jamrud at the mouth of the Khyber Pass. Portions of the film shot in India were filmed in Chitral and the North-West Frontier, and there are scenes very reminiscent of the Khyber Pass. However, some mountain scenes were also filmed in North Wales (Rhinog Fawr Mountain and Harlech).

One sequence shows an Indian Army gun crew unlimbering a mountain battery, a small field piece that was disassembled and transported on the backs of pack animals. Such guns were used frequently on the North-West Frontier, and a mountain battery from the Indian Army also was deployed with the ANZACs at the Gallipoli campaign (1915-1916). Similarly, a muleback radio set is used in the opening skirmish scene. During an early scene with his courtiers, Prince Ghul says that he was an observer at Gallipoli, and that emulation of British training and tactics, not religious enthusiasm, will be the key to his own army's success.

Reception
The film was well received in Britain but caused protests when shown in Bombay and Madras, where it was considered by many to be British propaganda.

References

External links
 
 
 
Criterion Collection Essay

1938 films
1930s color films
1938 adventure films
British adventure films
British Empire war films
Films about princes
Films directed by Zoltán Korda
Films set in the British Raj
London Films films
United Artists films
Films set in Peshawar
Films shot in Khyber Pakhtunkhwa
Films shot in Wales
Films based on British novels
Films produced by Alexander Korda
Films with screenplays by Patrick Kirwan
1930s British films